This is a list of electrical engineers (by no means exhaustive), people who have made notable contributions to electrical engineering or computer engineering.

See also
 List of engineers - for lists of engineers from other disciplines
 List of Russian electrical engineers

Engineers

Electrical Engineers